The New England Patriots are a professional American football team based in the Greater Boston town of Foxborough, Massachusetts. They play in the National Football League (NFL) as a member club of the league's American Football Conference (AFC) East division. Originally called the Boston Patriots, the team was founded as one of eight charter members of the American Football League (AFL) in 1960 under the ownership of Billy Sullivan. The team became part of the NFL when the two leagues merged in 1970. The following year, they moved from Boston to nearby Foxborough, and changed their name to the New England Patriots.

The modern NFL championship game, the Super Bowl, was founded in the 1966 season; the first four were contested between the champions of the AFL and the NFL. After the merger, the Super Bowl became the united league's championship. The Patriots made the 1963 AFL Championship Game, but struggled severely in the early years of the united league, not making the postseason until 1976. After a stretch of only one losing season in 13 years, including a Super Bowl appearance against a champion Bears outfit, the Patriots reached a nadir between 1989 and 1993 when they won only 19 of 80 games.

Since Bill Belichick was hired as the team's head coach in 2000, the Patriots have won six Super Bowls, nine AFC Championship Games, and sixteen AFC East titles, while amassing a regular season record of 237–82. The team's quarterback over that same period, Tom Brady, was awarded the NFL Most Valuable Player (MVP) three times, and the Super Bowl Most Valuable Player four times (he later won another Super Bowl MVP with the Buccaneers); he is one of only five players named Super Bowl MVP more than once, and the only one named more than three times.

The Patriots have won six Super Bowl championships (XXXVI, XXXVIII, XXXIX, XLIX, LI, and LIII). They also played in and lost Super Bowls XX, XXXI, XLII, XLVI, and LII. During the 2007 regular season, the Patriots became the only NFL team in history to win 16 games, and the first since the 1972 Miami Dolphins (in a 14-game season) to complete the regular campaign undefeated. Belichick's Patriots are one of only two teams to win three Super Bowls in four years (the other being the Dallas Cowboys from 1993 to 1996).

Overall, the Patriots have made 27 playoff appearances, one of which was before the merger. Since the merger, they have played fifteen AFC Championship Games, winning eleven of them to advance to the Super Bowl. In the Patriots' 58-year history, they have an overall regular season record of 500 wins, 391 losses, and 9 ties, plus an overall postseason record of 37 wins and 20 losses. In the 2018 NFL season, the Patriots reached their 11th Super Bowl, breaking their own record for most Super Bowl appearances by any organization of all time.

Seasons

Notes
The Season column links to an article about each season in the league (AFL for 1960–1969; NFL for 1970–present). The Team column links to an article about the Patriots' season that year. The Finish, Won, Lost, and Ties columns list regular season results and exclude any postseason play. Regular season and postseason results are combined only at the bottom of the list. In the Finish column, a "T-" indicates a tie for that position.
Beginning in 1974, the NFL began playing a 15-minute sudden-death overtime period if a regular season game finished regulation tied. Since this change, ties have been rarer. 
The Patriots and the Baltimore Colts finished tied. However, the Colts finished ahead of New England based on a better division record (7–1 to Patriots' 6–2).
The NFL expanded from a 14-game regular season schedule to 16 beginning in 1978.
The Patriots and Miami Dolphins finished the 1978 season with the same record. However, the Patriots were awarded the Division Championship based on a better division record (6–2 to the Dolphins' 5–3).
The 1982 NFL season was shortened from 16 regular seasons games to nine due to a players' strike. For playoff seedings, division standings were ignored and eight teams from each conference were seeded one through eight based on their regular season records.
The 1987 NFL season was shortened from 16 regular season games to 15 due to a players' strike.
The Patriots and Dolphins finished the 1994 season tied. As the Dolphins had defeated the Patriots in both regular season meetings, the Dolphins were named division champions and the Patriots received a Wild Card berth in the playoffs.
The Patriots and the Dolphins finished the 2001 season with the same record. However, the Patriots were named Division Champions based on a better division record (6–2 to the Dolphins' 5–3).
The Patriots, Dolphins, and New York Jets finished the season with 9–7 records in 2002. For having the best record against common opponents, the Jets were awarded the division championship. Neither the Patriots nor the Dolphins qualified for the playoffs.
The Patriots, Dolphins, and Baltimore Ravens (AFC North) finished the 2008 season tied with identical 11–5 records. As the Dolphins and Ravens had 8–4 records within the AFC, and the Patriots a 7–5 AFC record, the Dolphins were awarded the AFC East title, and the Ravens were given a Wild Card berth in the playoffs. The Patriots did not qualify for the playoffs.
Years here refer to the year in which the season was played. Playoff games are commonly played in the January and February of the following year.

See also
History of the New England Patriots

References
General

Bibliography

Specific

 
New England Patriots
seasons